Budin's tuco-tuco (Ctenomys budini) was formerly considered a species of rodent in the family Ctenomyidae.  It is endemic to southeast Jujuy Province in northwest Argentina. Given the extensive human presence in its limited range, it has been suspected to be threatened. The IUCN currently views it as a subspecies of C. frater. It was named after Emilio Budin, an Argentine specimen collector who worked with Oldfield Thomas.

References

Mammals of Argentina
Mammals described in 1913
Taxa named by Oldfield Thomas
Tuco-tucos
Endemic fauna of Argentina
Taxobox binomials not recognized by IUCN